Keith Powe (born June 5, 1969) is a former American football defensive end. He played for the BC Lions from 1991 to 1993, the Toronto Argonauts in 1993, the Tampa Bay Buccaneers from 1994 to 1995 and for the Winnipeg Blue Bombers in 1997.

References

1969 births
Living people
American football defensive ends
Lamar Cardinals football players
UTEP Miners football players
BC Lions players
Toronto Argonauts players
Tampa Bay Buccaneers players
Winnipeg Blue Bombers players